Ispahani Public School & College, Chittagong commonly referred to as IPSC is a private educational institution on Zakir Hossain Road in Chittagong, Bangladesh. This college is one of the top most reputed colleges of Chittagong. The institution offers primary, secondary and higher secondary education facilities under the Chittagong Education Board. Founded by Mirza Ahmad Ispahani in 1979 the institution is widely known for its excellent results in S.S.C. and H.S.C. exams and its discipline.Muntasirul Islam was the founding principal and rector of the Ispahani Public School (1979-1985).

History
The school started in 1981 with a three storied building having students of KG-1 to class Eight. By this time the school had grown with many multistoried buildings, Science laboratory, Library, Sports room and extended its level up to Higher Secondary. In 1989 the school achieved the status of a full pleasant Public School and starts offering primary secondary and Higher Secondary education facilities under the Chittagong Education Board from the academic year of 1989–90. The student first appeared in S.S.C exam in 1985 and H.S.C exam in 1991. Now the institution is widely known for its excellent result in S.S.C. and H.S.C. exam and its discipline{cn}.

School
From 2016, the institution decided to set class-3 as the entry level. IPSC authorities also started English version(NC).
 From 2017, IPSC started Day shift to meet up the demand of students to enroll in this renowned institution.

College
Every year IPSC takes around 800 students in science, business studies and humanities.

See also 
 Education in Bangladesh
 List of colleges in Chittagong

References

External links
https://web.archive.org/web/20181217202357/http://www.ipscctg.edu.bd/

Schools in Chittagong
Educational institutions established in 1979
1979 establishments in Bangladesh
Colleges in Bangladesh
Colleges in Chittagong